Justice Gunn may refer to:

George F. Gunn Jr., associate justice of the Supreme Court of Missouri
Walter T. Gunn, associate justice of the Supreme Court of Illinois